St Leonard's Church is a Church of England parish church in Wollaton, Nottinghamshire, England. Dating originally from the 13th century, the church was restored in the Victorian era and again in the 20th century. It is notable for the large number of funerary monuments it contains. Many are to the Willoughby family, of nearby Wollaton Hall. There is also a memorial to Robert Smythson, designer of the hall, and one of the first English architects. The church is a Grade II* listed building.

History
St. Leonard's dates from at least the early 13th century, the chancel being the earliest part, with the nave and tower dating from the 14th century. The Wollaton Antiphonal was in use in the church from the 1460s. The church has a long connection with the Willoughby family of Wollaton Hall who were the patrons of the parish. Monuments to the family, including a tomb chest and effigies to Henry Willoughby and his wives.

Memorials
The church contains an "exceptional number" of memorials. These include:
Richard Willoughby who died in 1471
Henry Willoughby of 1528
Henry Willoughby, 5th Baron Middleton 1800
Henry Willoughby, 6th Baron Middleton 1835
Robert Smythson - his monument describes him as "Gent., Architector and Survayor" and is possibly by Smythson's son, John.

References

Sources

External links
 Church website

Churches in Nottingham
Grade II* listed churches in Nottinghamshire
Church of England church buildings in Nottinghamshire